Joseph of Damascus (May 15, 1793 – July 10, 1860), born Joseph George Haddad Firzli, was a Greek Orthodox priest and educator who was glorified as a saint in 1993.

He is also known as "Father Joseph" in the Greek Orthodox Church of Antioch.

Life
Joseph was born in Beirut on May 15, 1793. He was the son of George MeHanna Haddad Firzli, a Lebanese craftsman of Antiochite Rūm descent. He was ordained a priest in 1817 for the Diocese of Damascus and served as director of the Patriarchal School in Damascus 1836–1860: under his leadership, the Patriarchal School became the leading Orthodox institution of higher learning in the Middle-East. He was martyred during the 1860 Damascus massacre when Druze and Muslim marauders led by Druze feudal lords destroyed part of the old city of Damascus and killed more than 11,000 Greek Orthodox and Melkite Greek Catholic Christians who had taken refuge in the churches and monasteries of Bab Tuma ("Saint Thomas’s Gate").

Legacy
Many alumni of Joseph's Patriarchal School of Theology became bishops and archpriests in Syria, Turkey, Lebanon, the United States and Brazil, most notably Raphael Hawaweeny, known as Raphael of Brooklyn, the first Orthodox Christian bishop consecrated on American soil, and Dom Ignatios Firzli, Greek Orthodox archbishop of Sao Paulo

See also
1860 Lebanon conflict
Greek Orthodox Church of Antioch
Massacres of Badr Khan

References

Further reading
“Christian Church to be Filled by a Damascus Preacher”, New York Times, Sept 15 1895
“Details of the Damascus Massacre”, New York Times, August 13, 1860

Greek Orthodox Christians from the Ottoman Empire
Members of the Greek Orthodox Church of Antioch
Ottoman Christian saints
Eastern Orthodox saints
Lebanese educators
Melkite Greek Catholic Church
People from Damascus
1793 births
1860 deaths
19th-century Christian saints
Syrian Christian saints
Christian martyrs